Campo de Besteiros is a civil parish in the municipality of Tondela, Portugal. The population in 2011 was 1,474, in an area of 7.93 km2.

References

Freguesias of Tondela
Towns in Portugal